The president of the Republic of South Ossetia is the de facto head of state of the partially recognized Republic of South Ossetia that is de jure part of Georgia. This is a list of the de facto presidents of the Republic of South Ossetia and the holders of the precursor to the office.

Non-presidential heads of state

List of presidents of South Ossetia

Latest election

2022 election

See also
Government of South Ossetia
Prime Minister of South Ossetia
Minister of Foreign Affairs (South Ossetia)

External links
Official website 
Rulers.org: South Ossetia
PlanetRulers.com: President of South Ossetia

South Ossetia
South Ossetia
Government of Ossetia